Fred Jüssi (born January 29, 1935) is an Estonian biologist, nature writer and photographer.

Jüssi was born in Aruba, Netherlands Antilles, where his father worked for a Venezuelan oil company. His family returned to Estonia and settled in Tallinn when Jüssi was 3 years old. After finishing high school in Tallinn he studied biology and zoology at the University of Tartu, graduating in 1958. He has worked as a school teacher (from 1958 to 1960 in Emmaste, Hiiumaa), as inspector for nature protection (1962–1975), radio broadcaster for Eesti Raadio, freelance writer and nature campaigner. In Eesti Raadio he ran the program Looduse aabits (ABC book of nature) from 1976 to 1986.

In October 1980, Jüssi was a signatory of the Letter of 40 Intellectuals, a public letter in which forty prominent Estonian intellectuals defended the Estonian language and protested the Russification policies of the Kremlin in Estonia.  The signatories also expressed their unease against Republic-level government in harshly dealing with youth protests in Tallinn that were sparked a week earlier due to the banning of a public performance of the punk rock band Propeller.

In the beginning of the 1990s he was for a few years the president of Estonian Nature Fund. Jüssi has published numerous books, articles and audio recordings related to nature. He was the first recipient of Eerik Kumari Award, given to him in 1989.

Jüssi is probably the most influential person in Estonia engaged in writing, talking and popularising nature.

Notes

1935 births
Estonian biologists
Estonian journalists
Living people
University of Tartu alumni
Recipients of the Order of the National Coat of Arms, 3rd Class
Recipients of the Order of the White Star, 4th Class